The 1993–94 NBA season was the Kings' 45th season in the National Basketball Association, and ninth season in Sacramento. The Kings had the seventh pick in the 1993 NBA draft, and selected Bobby Hurley out of Duke University. The Kings started the season winning three of their first four games, but then continued to struggle, losing 16 of their next 18 games leading to an awful 5–17 start, including eight straight losses. In December, things got worse for the Kings as Hurley was involved in a life-threatening car accident, and was out for the remainder of the season after only playing just 19 games, averaging 7.1 points and 6.1 assists per game. 

With Hurley out, Spud Webb would return to the lineup as starting point guard, after playing off the bench as backup for Hurley. Also in December, the team signed free agent LaBradford Smith, who was previously released by the Washington Bullets. The Kings continued to struggle, holding a 15–32 record at the All-Star break. At midseason, the team traded Pete Chilcutt to the Detroit Pistons in exchange for Olden Polynice. The Kings finished sixth in the Pacific Division with a 28–54 record.

Mitch Richmond averaged 23.4 points per game, and was named to the All-NBA Second Team, and was selected to start for the Western Conference in the 1994 NBA All-Star Game. In addition, Wayman Tisdale averaged 16.7 points and 7.1 rebounds per game, while Lionel Simmons provided the team with 15.1 points, 7.5 rebounds and 1.4 steals per game, Spud Webb contributed 12.7 points and 6.7 assists per game, and second-year forward Walt Williams provided with 11.2 points per game off the bench, but only played 57 games due to a leg injury.

Following the season, Tisdale signed as a free agent with the Phoenix Suns, and Smith was released to free agency.

Draft picks

Roster

Regular season

Season standings

z - clinched division title
y - clinched division title
x - clinched playoff spot

Record vs. opponents

Game log

Player statistics

Awards and records
 Mitch Richmond, All-NBA Second Team

Transactions

References

See also
 1993-94 NBA season

Sacramento Kings seasons
Sacramento
Sacramento
Sacramento

it:Sacramento Kings 1992-1993